Thailand Cricket Ground or Terdthai Cricket Ground is a college ground in Lat Krabang district, Bangkok, Thailand. The Terdthai Cricket Ground (TCG) in Thailand is where Thailand Cricket League matches are played.

In 2015, TCG was named as one of the hosts venues of the  Women's World Twenty20 Qualifier's along with Asian Institute of Technology Ground.

It also hosted the 2020 ACC Eastern Region T20 qualifier between Thailand, Hong Kong, Malaysia, Nepal and Singapore. It was the first time that an official Twenty20 International (T20I) men's tournament was played in Thailand.

List of Five Wicket Hauls

Twenty20 Internationals

This table summarizes the list of five wicket hauls taken at the venue.

See also

 Asian Institute of Technology Ground 
 2015 ICC Women's World Twenty20 Qualifier
 Cricket Association of Thailand

References

External links
 Cricketarchive
 TCG Cricket Ground to host International Matches
 Cricinfo

Cricket grounds in Bangkok
2010 establishments in Thailand